Jonathan Harris is professor of the History of Byzantium at Royal Holloway, University of London. Harris's research is in the area of "Byzantine History 900–1460; relations between Byzantium and the west, especially during the Crusades and the Italian Renaissance; the Greek diaspora after 1453."

Selected publications
The Lost World of Byzantium, New Haven and London: Yale University Press, 2015.
Byzantines, Latins and Turks in the Eastern Mediterranean World after 1150, Oxford: Oxford University Press, 2012. (Edited with Holmes, C. & Russell, E.)
The End of Byzantium, New Haven; London: Yale University Press, 2010.
Constantinople: Capital of Byzantium, London: Hambledon/Continuum, 2007.
Palgrave Advances in Byzantine History, Basingstoke and New York: Palgrave/Macmillan, 2005. (Editor)
Byzantium and the Crusades, London: Hambledon and London, 2003.

References 

Academics of Royal Holloway, University of London
Living people
Year of birth missing (living people)
British historians